Kvinna & man was released on 23 February 2005 and is a studio album from Swedish singer Lotta Engberg, where she together with Jarl Carlsson sings love songs. The last track on the album, "Nära livets mening", was recorded by her in Prague in the Czech Republic in 2003, together with the symphony orchestra Czech National Symphony Orchestra, as she turned 40 years old.

Track listing

Contributing musicians
Bow arrangement: Anders Lundqvist (5, 7, 15), Martin Schaub (3, 6, 8, 11)
Choir arrangement: Lotta Engberg, Per Strandberg
Vocals: Lotta Engberg, Jarl Carlsson
Drums and percussion: Per Lindvall
Bass: Tobias Gabrielsson
Grand piano and organ: Peter Ljung
Keyboards: Leif Ottebrand
Guitar: Mats Johansson, Per Strandberg (10), Henric Cederblom (11)
Saxophone, flute and oboe: Wojtek Goral
Choir: Lotta Engberg, Per Strandberg, Magnus Bäcklund, Amanda & Malin Engberg
Bow: (5, 7, 15) Åsa Stove Paulsson, Emilia Erlandsson, Susanne Magnusson
Anders Andersson: Håkan Westlund, Amanda Sjönemo, Peter Gardemar
Bow: (3, 6, 8, 11) Elin Stjärna, Tarik Lindström, Mats Lindberg, Thomas Lindström
Synthesizer programming: Per Strandberg (12)
Czech National Symphony Orchestra (16)
Trumpet: Magnus Johsnsson (2, 7)

References

2005 albums
Lotta Engberg albums
Collaborative albums